Sonatane is a Tongan masculine given name. Notable people with the name include:

Sonatane Takulua (born 1991), Tongan rugby union footballer
Sonatane Tuʻa Taumoepeau-Tupou (1943–2013), Tongan diplomat

Polynesian masculine given names